Ermionida is a municipality in the Argolis regional unit, Peloponnese, Greece. The seat of the municipality is the town Kranidi. The municipality has an area of 421 km2.

Municipality
The municipality Ermionida was formed at the 2011 local government reform by the merger of the following 2 former municipalities, that became municipal units:
Ermioni
Kranidi

Province
The province of Ermionida was one of the three provinces of Argolis Prefecture. It was abolished in 2006. Its territory covered the territory of the present Ermionida municipality.

References

Municipalities of Peloponnese (region)
Populated places in Argolis
Provinces of Greece